The Baitarani (also spelled Vaitarani) is one of six major rivers of Odisha, India.  Venerated in popular epics and legends, the Baitarani River is a source of water for agricultural irrigation.   The coastal plain of Odisha has the name of "Hexadeltaic region" or the "Gift of Six Rivers". These deltas divide the coastal plain into three regions from north to south. The Baitarani, the Mahanadi and the Brahmani rivers form the Middle Coastal Plain, with evidence of past "back bays" and present lakes.

Sources

The Baitarani originates from the Gonasika/Guptaganga (Cow Nose Shaped) hills, and starts flowing over a stone looking like the nostril of a cow. Afterwards for about half a kilometre the river flows underground and is not visible from outside. The beginning portion of Baitarani acts as the small part of boundary between the states of Odisha and Jharkhand.

Course
The river enters a plain at Anandapur and creates a deltaic zone at Akhuapada. The river has 65 tributaries, of which 35 join from the left side and 30 join from the right side. The river basin in Odisha is spread among 42 blocks of eight districts. Budhi, Kanjori, Ambajhara, Mushal, Kusei, Salandi are some of the tributaries of Baitarani.

Location
A major portion of the river basin lies within the state of Odisha, while a small patch of the upper reach lies in Jharkhand state. The upper Baitarani basin on the western slopes of the Eastern Ghats, comprising the Panposh-Keonjhar-Pallahara plateau, is one of the two plateaus forming "The Central Plateaus"—one of Odisha's five major morphological regions.

Dams and barrages

Dams and barrages on the Baitarani and its major tributary, the Salandi, irrigate .
A new barrage was established near Anandapur and it was inaugurated by the CM of Odisha, Naveen Patnaik.

Flooding
Flooding is a regular phenomenon in the Baitarani basin. The inhabitants, near the river, live in a fear of loss to life and property. Even a two-day rain in July 2005 caused the river to overflow its banks, affecting 140,000 people in 220 villages of Jajpur and Bhadrak districts.  In at least two  places the embankments were breached and marooning occurred, inflicting massive losses of life and property. Apart from the long pending construction of a dam at Bhimkund and proposed other measures like river bed excavation and construction of embankments etc. in the deltaic region, there remain the unaddressed land use issues in the upstream, to which, till date, no serious thoughts or efforts have been directed.

Industry and water quality
Due to drainage into the Bay of Bengal, its water become salty as it heads towards the end of the River.

Baitarani basin, with its rich mineral and agricultural resources and with availability of cheap labour, offered an ideal ground for establishment and operation of various industries.  However, the principal development activities in the industrial, agricultural and mining sectors have contributed significantly towards deterioration in the water quality.

Cultural impact
It forms part of the boundary between Balasore district and Undivided Cuttack district. There is a saying that "he who bathes in it and gives alms will always be free from torments inflicted by Yama."

The district Jajpur is the gift of river Baitarani. Historical evidences show early civilization on the bank of this river. Currently the district is subject to massive floods which are common during monsoon.

References

Rivers of Jharkhand
Rivers of Odisha
Rivers of India
Geography of Odisha